Ta' Dmejrek is the highest point of Malta, located on the Dingli Cliffs, with an elevation of 253 metres (830 ft) above sea level.

See also
 Geography of Malta
 Extreme points of Malta
 List of highest points of European countries

References

External links
 "Ta'Dmejrek – Climbing, Hiking & Mountaineering" on Mountain-forecast
 "Dingli Cliffs, Malta" on Peakbagger

Dingli
Mountains under 1000 metres
Hills of Malta
Highest points of countries
Extreme points of Malta